The Joševica massacre was a war crime committed by the paramilitary forces of the Krajina Serbs in the Croatian village of Joševica during the Croatian War of Independence. The atrocities took place on December 16 of 1991.

Serb paramilitary forces killed 21 Croatian civilians in the village of  Joševica near the city of Glina. The Serb paramilitaries were members of a reconnaissance and sabotage group of the local Glina Territorial Defense, they entered the village on 16 December 1991, armed with submachine guns attached with silencers, and shot Croat civilians in their homes. One civilian survived the attack with serious wounds. After a few weeks, Serb paramilitary forces perpetrated another massacre, killing another 3 Croats. In total, 32 residents of Joševica out of 133 that had lived in Joševica (census 1991) were killed. The victims were mostly women and elderly, the eldest victim being 90 years old, while four victims were children aged between 10 and 16. 

At the time there was no active combat in the Joševica area, as the forces of rebel Serbs had already occupied the area. Serb military commanders had also made guarantees to the local Croats that they would enjoy peace and safety if they did not partake in armed resistance. It has been speculated that the Serb paramilitaries may have committed the massacre in revenge for losses they had sustained in battle with the Croatian Army on the 12 and 13 December 1991.

Investigation 
At the time, one Nikola Sužnjević, an investigating judge in the employ of the then-Republic of Serbian Krajina (in 2008 a member of the city council of Glina) had investigated the events and made a detailed record with a precise list of victims and the description of how those persons were killed. Despite that, the occupation authorities of RSK took no further actions, and the perpetrators were not legally processed, despite the existence of witnesses that named the victims.

The State Attorney's Office of the Republic of Croatia (DORH) has indicted six citizens of the Republic of Serbia for the Joševica case. All of them had left for Serbia in 1995 after the Croatian Operation Flash, where they took permanent residence. DORH brought the indictment forward almost 17 years after the events.

References

External links 
MKSBJ Indictment against Vojislav Šešelj
Istraga Joševica

Mass murder in 1991
1991 in Croatia
Massacres in 1991
Serbian war crimes in the Croatian War of Independence
Massacres in Croatia
Republic of Serbian Krajina
December 1991 events in Europe
1991 crimes in Croatia
1991 murders in Europe
1990s murders in Croatia
History of Banovina
Massacres of Croats
Massacres in the Croatian War of Independence